Eralash or Yeralash is a Russian trick-taking card game that is similar to whist. The Russian word "Eralash" means "jumble".

Description
Like whist and bridge, Eralash is played by foursomes divided into two partnerships facing each other, although it is possible to play variants of the game with only two or three players. It was a popular game in Russia before the Soviet era.

Rules
A full bridge deck of 52 cards is completely dealt out to the players for each hand. The cards in each suit rank from highest to lowest: A K Q J 10 9 8 7 6 5 4 3 2. Like whist, partners are determined by drawing cards, trump is determined by the last card dealt, and verbal strategy and planning (table talk) is not allowed. Partners work together to secure as many tricks as possible. Points are awarded for any tricks taken in a hand in excess of 7 — in other words, a partnership taking 8 tricks is awarded 1 point. The first partnership to gain 13 points wins the robber.

Terminology 
 Leva A trick
 Robber A game consisting of 13 points
 Secant A few cards in the same suit, starting from Ace.
 Singleton  A hand containing a single card of any suit.
 Comet  When a card is trumped by both opposing players.
 Invit One player plays the lowest card of the strongest suit, inviting their partner to play the highest card.
 Sext major  Six cards in order, from ace to nine inclusive.
 Quarte major  Four cards in order, from ace to jack inclusive.
 Terz Major Ace, King and Queen.
 Force  By leading a suit that your opponent does not have, you force the player to trump.
 To have tenas  To have the first and third of the highest cards and be the last in the game in order.

Mentions in Russian literature 
Fyodor Dostoevsky, Demons 
 His whole figure seemed to exclaim “Cards! Me sit down to jumble with you! Is it consistent? Who is responsible for it? Who has shattered my energies and turned them to jumble? Ah, perish, Russia!” and he would majestically trump with a heart.

Ivan Turgenev, Fathers and Sons
 "Indeed? After dinner, then, we will have a jumble, and I will despoil him utterly."
 "Ha, ha, ha! We shall see, we shall see."

References

External links
Rules of the Eralash Card Game 

Contract bridge
Russian card games
Year of introduction missing
French deck card games